The Tulsa Renegades were a soccer club based in Tulsa, Oklahoma that competed in the SISL and USISL.

Year-by-year

Sports in Tulsa, Oklahoma
Defunct soccer clubs in Oklahoma
Defunct indoor soccer clubs in the United States
USISL teams
1989 establishments in Oklahoma
1992 disestablishments in Oklahoma
Association football clubs established in 1989
Association football clubs disestablished in 1992